The Democrat Union of Africa is an alliance of centre-right political parties in Africa.  Founded in Dakar, Senegal, in 1997, it is affiliated with the global International Democrat Union. It aims to bring together parties with similar aims and political goals, such as the protection of democracy and individual liberty, from the whole of Africa, with its headquarters being found in Accra, Ghana.

2019 Meeting in Accra, Ghana 
A meeting of the Democrat Union of Africa occurred with the support of the IDU on 3–5 February 2019 in Accra, Ghana. 17 parties from within the DUA were represented at this meeting.

The Meeting was opened by the Secretary General of Ghana's New Patriotic Party, John Bouadu. President of the Popular Democratic Movement, McHenry Venaani, was elected chairman of DUA at this meeting, and President of Ghana Nana Akufo-Addo took the role as Honorary Patron of the Democratic Union of Africa. The title was accepted for him on his behalf by Vice-President of Ghana, H:E Dr Mahamudu Bawumia.

In an address to Ghanaian media at the meeting in Accra, IDU Secretary General Christian Kattner said that, ‘we need a strong Democrat Union of Africa offering a sustainable network for political parties on the African continent, fighting together for freedom and democracy in order to ensure a better life of all people of Africa.’

Interim Steering Committee 
The Interim Steering Committee was elected at the Meeting in Accra in February 2019. The results of the election are as follows;

 Chairman: Mr McHenry Venaani,  Leader of the Opposition and President of the Popular Democratic Movement of Namibia
 Vice-Chairman for North Africa: Mr. Rahhal El Makkaoui, Member of the Executive Committee in Charge of International Relations, Istiqlal Party, Morocco
 Vice-Chairman for East Africa: Mrs. Ingrid Turinawe Kamateneti, Secretary for Mobilization, Forum for Democratic Change, Uganda
 Vice Chairman for West Africa: Mr. John Boadu, Secretary General, New Patriotic Party, Ghana
 Representative: Mrs. Linette Olofsson, Head of the Department of Foreign Affairs, Democratic Movement, Mozambique, for women and for the Portuguese-speaking communities of Africa
 Representative: Mrs. N’guessan Edwidge Wassa Aamoin, Parti Democratique, Côte d`Ivoire, for youth and the French-speaking communities of Africa

Member parties

Full Members

Observer members

Footnotes

External links
Democrat Union of Africa official website

International Democrat Union
Pan-African organizations
Political parties established in 1997
Political party alliances in Africa
Politics of Africa
Transnational political parties